Goran Grgić (born 17 November 1965) is a Croatian theatre, television and film actor.

Grgić graduated from the Zagreb Academy of Dramatic Art in 1990. Upon graduation he was hired as a regular cast member at the Gavella theatre in Zagreb. Since 2002 he has been a member of cast at the Croatian National Theatre in Zagreb.

Partial filmography

Fragments: Chronicle of a Vanishing (Krhotine - Kronika jednog nestajanja, 1991) - Doktor
Zlatne godine (The Golden Years, 1994) - Mislav Petras
The Price of Life (Cijena života, 1994) - Dusan
Gospa (1995) - Interviewer
Noć za slušanje (1995, Short) - Tvrtko
Russian Meat (Rusko meso, 1997) - Hrvoje
The Three Men of Melita Žganjer (Tri muškarca Melite Žganjer, 1998) - Vodja snimanja
Transatlantic (1998) - Austrijski Casnik
Četverored (1999) - fra Lujo Milicevic
Garcia (1999)
Bogorodica (1999)
Celestial Body (Nebo sateliti, 2000) - Senna
Slow Surrender (Polagana predaja, 2001)
Queen of the Night (Kraljica noći, 2001) - Doktor Janda
Behind Enemy Lines (2001) - Technician
Sami (2001)
God Forbid a Worse Thing Should Happen (2002) - Direktor
Horseman (Konjanik, 2003) - Andrija
Ispod crte (2003) - Inspektor
Long Dark Night (Duga mračna noć, 2004) - Franz Kirchmeier
First Class Thieves (2005) - Dramski Prvak
Sleep Sweet, My Darling (Snivaj, zlato moje, 2005) - Redatelj
Libertas (2006) - Luka
Kradljivac uspomena (2007)
I Have to Sleep, My Angel (Moram spavat', anđele, 2007) - Otac
No One's Son (Ničiji sin, 2008) - Inspektor
Zapamtite Vukovar (2008)
U zemlji cudesa (2009) - Gospodin
Tito (2010, TV Mini-Series) - Archbishop Stepinac
Lea and Darija (2011) - Dubravko Dujsin
Blurs (2011) - Lanin tata
Duh babe Ilonke (2011) - Grobar
Cvjetni trg (2012) - Ministar
Simon Cudotvorac (2013) - Vedran
A Perfect Day (2015) - Commander at the Checkpoint
Wasn't Afraid to Die (2016) - Franjo Greguric
Anka (2017) - Sudac
Lavina (2017) - Majstor Tvrtko
F20 (2018) - Tata
Koja je ovo država! (2018) - Sef tajne sluzbe
Ufuraj se i pukni (2019)
Zagrebacki Ekvinocij (2019) - Uberovac
General (2019) - Pukovnik M. P.

See also
Croatian National Theatre in Zagreb

References

External links

1965 births
Living people
People from Osijek
Academy of Dramatic Art, University of Zagreb alumni
Croatian male actors